Stéphane Gagba (born May 13, 1998), better known professionally as Stéphane Legar, is a Togolese-Israeli singer, dancer, and model. His stage name is either Legar or Le Gar – short for Le Garçon, "the boy" in French. He is often simply referred to by his mononym Stéphane.

Early life
Stéphane Gagba was born in Bat Yam, Israel, to Christian parents from Togo. His parents were foreign diplomats working in the Nigerian embassy in Israel at the time. He has an older sister. As a child he spent most of his holidays visiting their relatives in Togo.

As a child, he was nominated for deportation from Israel – due to lacking citizenship – as he only had a resident status. Although, he was a citizen of Togo (Togolese passport). Until the age of 10, his parents protected him from this awareness. Eventually, he acquired an Israeli citizenship as well – but only after he finished his Israeli military service, on 3 May 2021.

At the age of 12, Legar moved with his family to Holon, Israel. He attended the youth village school Mikveh Israel, in its French sector. He enlisted in August 2017 to the Israel Defense Forces and served in a unit responsible for explaining the recruitment process to high schoolers.

Career
At 14, he started as a model for the Castro clothing chain.
After that as an acclaimed dancer he won the Israeli hiphop dance championship twice, in 2016 he was cast to dance in a Static & Ben El Tavori clip.

In October 2016 he released his first hit song Step Fun which got millions of online views and trending dances from the song. In 2017 he made a song with Israeli singer Noa Kirel named "Tikitas"().
Ever since than he was one of the most successful hiphop artists in Israel, and has fans from the whole world(France and Israel mainly).

Personal life
His native language is French, but he is also fluent in Hebrew, Ewe (Togolese), English, and Spanish.

Discography
2020: "Rak Banot" ll  (ft. Itay Levi)
2022: "SPEED LIFE"

Awards and nominations

References

External links 
 

1998 births
21st-century Togolese people
21st-century Israeli male singers
Living people
People from Bat Yam
People from Holon
Israeli Christians
Israeli people of Togolese descent
Naturalized citizens of Israel
Togolese artists